The 2005 Syracuse Orange football team represented  Syracuse University during the 2005 NCAA Division I-A football season. The Orange were coached by first-year head coach Greg Robinson and played their home games at the Carrier Dome in Syracuse, New York.

In 2015, Syracuse vacated the one win from this season among others from the 2004 to 2006 seasons following an eight-year NCAA investigation, as the NCAA found that some football players who committed academic fraud participated in the wins.

Schedule

References

Syracuse
Syracuse Orange football seasons
Syracuse Orange football